Waverly disaster may refer to two events which have occurred in Waverly, Tennessee:

Waverly, Tennessee, tank car explosion
2021 Tennessee floods